All Saints Episcopal Church is a historic Episcopal church in Appleton, Wisconsin. A parish in the Diocese of Fond du Lac, it is the only Episcopal church in Appleton. The congregation first met circa 1854 and organized in 1856. The current church building was consecrated in 1905.

History
Missionary bishop Jackson Kemper held the first Episcopal service in Appleton in "1854 or 1855". The parish was organized in 1856, and originally named Grace Episcopal Church. The first church building's cornerstone was laid by Bishop Kemper in 1864 and completed in 1866. The wooden structure cost $6,000 and was located at Appleton and Edwards (now Washington) streets. In 1883, the original building was moved to the current church site at College Avenue and Drew Street, adjacent to Lawrence University.

In 1905, that building was moved across the street while the current church building was constructed on the site.  The 1905 building was designed by Shepley, Rutan & Coolidge.  All Saints Norman stone tower is modeled on the tower of the church in Appleton-le-Street, Yorkshire.  In 1905, the name of the parish was changed to All Saints Episcopal Church. An estimated 1,500 to 2,000 people attended the cornerstone-laying service, presided over by Bishop Charles Chapman Grafton, on October 1, 1905. The first service in the completed building was celebrated on Easter Sunday, April 15, 1906. Bishop Reginald Heber Weller preached; the Rev. S. P. Delany was rector.

At 3:50 a.m., November 30, 1949, a taxi driver reported that a fire had broken out at All Saints. The fire started in the basement and burned through the floor, causing the altar to fall into the basement and charring the rest of the interior of the church. The altar, which was fairly new, the reredos, the organ, the carved choir stalls, a Tiffany window, and the bishop's chair were destroyed, but the baptistry was spared. Vestments and other fabrics were smoke-damaged. The total loss was estimated at $75,000. The interior of the church dates from 1950, rebuilt after the fire by architectural firm Maurey Lee Allen. Bishop Harwood Sturtevant  officially rededicated All Saints with special services featuring a new organ on All Saints Sunday 1952.  The organ, built by M. P. Moller, was installed in 1951.

The 1910 Reid Memorial Window, a Tiffany window depicting Dorcas, Acts of the Apostles (9:36–42,) was destroyed in the 1949 fire.

In 1959, building plans by J. Rouman & Associates for the parish center were approved, and the rectory and neighboring house on the corner were torn down. Construction began in 1960 and was completed in January 1961. Parish "work parties" painted and did other finishing work. The dedication of the parish center was on April 30, 1961.

Gerald F. Gilmore, formerly assistant minister  at St. John's Episcopal Church, Lafayette Square, became rector in 1949.  Rev. Patrick Twomey had been rector for 19 years when he retired in 2015.

A  five-volume scrapbook, History of All Saints Episcopal Church (Grace Church), was compiled by Ann P. Kloehn and Joyce Barlow Helien is in the possession of the church.

People and Community

Nathan Pusey, who was a member while serving as President of Lawrence College from 1944–1953, was an active partisan in the movement that pushed All Saints into the "low church" column at a time when Wisconsin was predominately "high church."(See folder 4, Correspondence, Nathan Pusey Presidential Papers, 1925-2005 | Lawrence University Archives)

All Saints is a worship community with activities including Sunday School, adult education, youth group, music ministry, pastoral care and a parish nursing program. Parish-organized outreach efforts see parishioners devote time and assistance to local charitable organizations including Emergency Shelter of the Fox Valley, Harbor House Domestic Abuse Shelter and Leaven. All Saints also holds several large in-gatherings each year to support these organizations. The Outreach Committee, based on determination of need, directs the in-gatherings.

With its central, downtown location, the building is used by community groups including Attic Theatre, events for Lawrence University and meetings of the Diocese of Fond du Lac.

References

External links
Official Website
Diocese of Fond du Lac
The Episcopal Church
The Anglican Communion

Episcopal churches in Wisconsin
Religious organizations established in 1856
Churches in Appleton, Wisconsin
1856 establishments in Wisconsin
Churches completed in 1905